Franz Waldenberger is  professor for Japanese economy at the Ludwig Maximilian University of Munich and the director of the German Institute for Japanese Studies (DIJ).

Career
Waldenberger began to research the Japanese economy in 1992 when he became a research assistant at the DIJ. He examined industrial organization and the employment and financial system of Japan. His habilitation thesis was on the subject of "Organisation und Evolution arbeitsteiliger Systeme – Erkenntnisse aus der japanischen Wirtschaftsentwicklung" ("The organisation and evolution of division of labour – insights from Japanese economic development"). In 1997, he became professor for Japanese economy  at the Ludwig Maximilian University of Munich. Since then he has added corporate governance, Japan's external links, and monetary and fiscal policy to his research interests. He has taken a five year leave from his position in Munich to become director of the German Institute for Japanese Studies since October 2014.

Selected publications
Die vertikale Integration von Unternehmen. Eine theoretische und empirische Analyse. Untersuchungen zur Wirtschaftspolitik, Bd. 86. Köln: Institut für Wirtschaftspolitik an der Universität zu Köln. 1991.
Die japanische Wirtschaft heute - Ein Überblick. Miscellanea 10. Bonn, Tokyo: Deutsches Institut für Japanstudien. 170 S. 1994.
Firms and Markets: Why Is Japan Different?. Miscellanea 8. Bonn, Tokyo: Deutsches Institut für Japanstudien. 33 S. 1994.
Organisation und Evolution arbeitsteiliger Systeme - Erfahrungen aus der japanischen Wirtschaftsentwicklung. Monographien aus dem Deutschen Institut für Japanstudien 21. München: iudicium Verlag. 226 S., geb. 1999.

References

External links
Official website

Living people
German Historical Institutes
Academic staff of the Ludwig Maximilian University of Munich
Year of birth missing (living people)